Blackoustic is a collaborative acoustic album by Stratovarius and Cain's Offering vocalist Timo Kotipelto and ex-Sonata Arctica and Cain's Offering guitarist Jani Liimatainen (credited as Kotipelto & Liimatainen). The album was released on October 19, 2012, and entered the Finnish charts at #13 the first week. The album is self-financed. While initially only sold during performances, the album was eventually released through the Earmusic label, which had released the prior Stratovarius albums since Polaris.

All songs from the album are covers, except for "Where My Rainbow Ends" written by Liimatainen. Regarding the song, Liimatainen commented, "I remembered a song I wrote last winter. Originally it was an instrumental track, but after listening back to it I thought that the melody would work very well with vocals. We rearranged the song into our acoustic format and as a slave of habit I wrote the lyrics for it the night before our last day of recording. It turned out surprisingly beautiful and delicate.

After the release of the album the duo began touring, performing in shows taking place through November 23, 2012.

Track listing

Personnel
 Timo Kotipelto – lead vocals, additional acoustic guitar
 Jani Liimatainen – acoustic guitar, backing vocals
 Matias Kupiainen – mixing, mastering

References 

2012 albums
Covers albums
Edel Music albums
Collaborative albums